A list of American films released in 1981.

The Academy Award winner of Best Picture of 1981 was Chariots of Fire.
The highest-grossing film of 1981 was Raiders of the Lost Ark.



A–C

D–G

H–M

N–S

T–Z

See also
 1981 in American television
 1981 in the United States

External links

 
 List of 1981 box office number-one films in the United States

1981
Films
Lists of 1981 films by country or language